Nine Mile station is an island platformed RTD light rail station in Aurora, Colorado, United States. The station was opened on November 17, 2006, and is operated by the Regional Transportation District as part of the H and R lines. When it opened in 2006, it was the terminus of the H Line Southeast Corridor trains traveling along Interstate 225. After the opening of the R Line in 2017, trains on the H Line were extended northeast to Florida station.

Nine Mile station is named after, and built at the approximate location of, the historic Nine Mile House, one of several stage stops along the Smoky Hill Trail. This stop was nine miles from Denver.

References

RTD light rail stations
Transportation buildings and structures in Aurora, Colorado
Railway stations in the United States opened in 2006
2006 establishments in Colorado
Railway stations in highway medians